Lycus is the type genus of net-winged beetles in the Lycidae family and the tribe Lycini: found in Africa and the Americas.

List of species

References

 
 Biolib

Elateroidea genera
Lycidae